Winton, Washington is a small unincorporated community close to Lake Wenatchee and the Wenatchee National Forest. It is in Chelan County in the state of Washington. The town's only school district, Cascade School District, is located in Leavenworth and includes five schools.  It is assigned ZIP code 98826, the same as Leavenworth, Washington, approximately 10 miles (16 km) to the south.

U.S. Route 2 passes through the community.

External links
Cascade School District

References

Unincorporated communities in Washington (state)
Unincorporated communities in Chelan County, Washington